Bilbao La Vieja in Spanish, "Old Bilbao" in English and Bilbo Zaharra in Basque.

It is a neighbourhood of Bilbao and part of the 5th district of the city (Ibaiondo).

Location 
In the city center, it lies right across the estuary, on the left bank of the Nervion River, united to the Old Town by the bridge of San Anton pictured above (portrayed in the city's coat of arms).

History

Past 
Bilbao La Vieja is the oldest neighbourhood of Bilbao, being older than even the medieval urban district (Casco Viejo), founded in 1300.

The development of Bilbao la Vieja was closely linked to that of the Miribilla mines, on the top of the Miribilla mountain behind the old neighborhood. Recently redeveloped as a newly built neighborhood.  Bilbao La Vieja was traditionally where the majority of the miners resided.  It was some of the first land used as an expansion of the medieval city was undertaken in the 18th and 19th centuries and became a fashionable neighborhood by the end of the 19th century.

Today 
Due to its strategic location within the city of Bilbao and the end of the minery days years ago, Bilbao la Vieja is getting through a deep gentrification process.

Under the municipal government's new initiatives the neighborhood is redeveloping, with a number of new businesses and subsidies aimed at urban renewal and attracting the young to the area. This initiative has been largely very fruitful thus far. Many new shops and young entrepreneurs are setting up shop.

The neighborhood is also home to a growing immigrant population, making it one of the most vibrant communities in Bilbao.

Transport

By foot 

 Direct from Abando.
 Direct from Casco Viejo through Ribera bridge, el Merced bridge and San Antón bridge.
 8 minutes (Approx.) from Moyúa.

Metro 

Bilbao la Vieja has no stations itself. However, a number of them lie right next to it:

 Abando station
 Casco Viejo station

Train 

Bilbao la Vieja has no stations itself. However, a number of them lie right next to it:

 Abando station
 Atxuri station

BilboBus 

Lines and stops:

Nightlife

Cafés 
 Café Nervión, Calle La Naja, 7
 La Viña, Calle San Francisco, 17
 Marzana, Calle Marzana, 16

Discos 

 Bullit Groove Club, Calle Dos de Mayo, 3
 Conjunto Vacío, Muelle de la Merced, 3
 El balcón de la Lola, Calle de Bailén, 10
 Le Club, Muelle Marzana, 4

Music 

 BilboRock. (Calle Muelle de la Merced 1) 
Formerly a church, now refurbished as concert hall. Local and international bands.

Restaurants 
 À Table, Calle Dos de Mayo, 18
 Ágape, Calle Hernani, 13
 Berebar, Calle San Francisco, 65
 El Churrasco, Calle Conde Mirasol, 9

External links 
 Bilbao la Vieja, San Francisco Zabala FORUM 
 Bilbao en Construcción (Bilbao la Vieja)

Geography of Bilbao